Would-Be-Goods are a British indie pop band fronted by singer Jessica Griffin, noted for her precise received pronunciation accent when singing. Their name was inspired by the 1901 novel The Wouldbegoods, by children's author E. Nesbit.

Career
On her first album, released on the él label, Griffin had no band of her own, and was backed by members of The Monochrome Set. The Camera Loves Me was critically acclaimed in the UK and Japan. In 1993 Griffin worked with the Monochrome Set on a second album, Mondo, produced by Monochrome Set singer Bid and released on the Japanese label Polystar. This album was later released in the UK on the Cherry Red label.

Peter Momtchiloff, formerly of Talulah Gosh, Heavenly, and Marine Research and guitarist in Scarlet's Well, joined the band as lead guitarist and bassist in 1999. Two EPs, Emmanuelle Béart and Sugar Mummy, were released in 2001 and 2002 respectively, followed by a new album, Brief Lives, a joint release by US label Matinée Recordings and UK-based Fortuna Pop!. By this time two new members had joined the band: Deborah Green (former member of Thee Headcoatees) on drums and Lupe Nuñez-Fernandez on bass. After the band recorded a fourth album, The Morning After, in 2004, Nuñez-Fernandez left to concentrate on touring and recording with her own band Pipas and was replaced by Andy Warren, former member of Adam and the Ants and The Monochrome Set. Would-be-goods' fifth album, Eventyr, was released in November 2008. 
The band began working on a sixth album in 2019.

In October 2020 Jessica Griffin began a project which took the form of a game or challenge, writing a song a day, with a new title provided every evening by her partner and bandmate Peter Momtchiloff. All the songs were written and performed by Jessica. Fifteen of the songs were released on Bandcamp (as three five-song EPs) in March 2021.

A further five-song digital EP, Saturn's Child, was released on Bandcamp in August 2021.

Would-Be-Goods have performed live in the United States, Spain, Sweden, Finland, Denmark and France as well as the UK.

Discography

Singles and EPs
 Fruit Paradise / "Hanging Gardens of Reigate" (7-inch single, él Records, 1987)
 The Camera Loves Me / "Cecil Beaton's Scrapbook" (7-inch single, él Records, 1988)
 Emmanuelle Béart: "Emmanuelle Béart" / "Je lèche les vitrines" / "Everybody Wants My Baby" / "Words" (four-track EP, Matinee Recordings, 2001)
 Sugar Mummy: "Sugar Mummy" / "Spanish Tragedy" / "Perfect Dear" (7-inch EP single, Fortuna Pop! Records, 2002)
 From The Depths: "Rafferty" / "Bats In The Belfry" / "The Wind Will Change" / "Cavanagh, Cody and Byrne" / "Ouija Board Romance" (five-track digital EP, Bandcamp https://would-be-goods.bandcamp.com, 2021)
 Spring Fever: "Charm School" / "The King Of The Moon" / "Temporary Arrangement" / "The Kiss Of Death" / "There's A Star On My Dressing-Room Door" (five-track digital EP, Bandcamp https://would-be-goods.bandcamp.com, 2021)
 The Violet Hour: "The Love Parade" / "The Night Life" / "Born Bad" / "Wild West" / "It's Such A Shame About Susie" (five-track digital EP, Bandcamp https://would-be-goods.bandcamp.com, 2021)
 Saturn's Child: "Saturn's Child" / "Foreign Affairs" / "Madame X" / "I've Forgotten Him Now" / "Goodbye To All That" (five-track digital EP, Bandcamp https://would-be-goods.bandcamp.com, 2021)

Albums 
 The Camera Loves Me (CD and LP, él Records/Cherry Red, 1988; re-released with bonus tracks in 1999 and 2003)
 Mondo (CD, Polystar, 1993)
 Brief Lives (CD, Matinee Recordings, 2002)
 The Morning After (CD, Matinee Recordings, 2004)
 Eventyr (CD, Matinee Recordings, 2008)

References

External links
 Official website
 Would-be-goods page at Matinée Recordings
 Would-be-goods page at Cherry Red

British indie pop groups